We'll Really Hurt You is a 1998 Italian comedy film written and directed  by Pino Quartullo.

Plot

Cast
 
 Pino Quartullo as  Marco
 Ricky Memphis as  Ruggero	
 Stefania Sandrelli as  Federica Birki
 Anna Valle as  Monica
  Nathalie Caldonazzo as Cinzia
 Venantino Venantini as  Pietro
  Rocco Barbaro as  Alvise Mantovani
 Caterina Guzzanti as  Verde
  Filippo Corlini as Miro
 Michele Cucuzza as himself

References

External links

Italian comedy films
1998 comedy films
1998 films
Films directed by Pino Quartullo
1990s Italian-language films
1990s Italian films